Llangedwyn Halt railway station was a station on the Tanat Valley Light Railway in Llangedwyn, Powys, Wales. The station opened in 1904 and closed in 1951. There was a passing loop so there were two platforms with waiting shelters situated to the east of a level crossing. There was a siding from the east end serving the goods yard to the north of the station. The site today is occupied by Llangedwyn Home Farm.

References

Further reading

Disused railway stations in Powys
Railway stations in Great Britain opened in 1904
Railway stations in Great Britain closed in 1951
Former Cambrian Railway stations